Antilocapra is a genus of the family Antilocapridae, which contains only a single living species, the pronghorn (Antilocapra americana). Another species, the Pacific pronghorn, lived in California during the Late Pleistocene and survived as recently as 12,000 BP. The name means "antelope-goat". 

Antilocapra is the only surviving genus of pronghorn, though three other genera  (Capromeryx, Stockoceros and Tetrameryx) existed in North America up until the end of the Pleistocene.

References

Mammal genera
Mammal genera with one living species
Pronghorns
Taxa named by George Ord